The 1923 Washington and Lee Generals football team represented Washington and Lee University during the 1923 college football season. The Generals competed in the Southern Conference (SoCon) and were coached by Jimmy DeHart in his second year as head coach, compiling a 6–2–1 record overall with a 4–0–1 mark in SoCon play.

Schedule

References

Washington and Lee
Washington and Lee Generals football seasons
Southern Conference football champion seasons
Washington and Lee Generals football